Palomar Street station is a station on the Blue Line of the San Diego Trolley located in the city of Chula Vista, California. The stop serves a variety of purposes, holding the function of commuter center with a park and ride lot and providing access to the nearby commercial, industrial, and residential areas, as well as Southwestern Community College.

History

This station was renovated, starting March 2014, as part of the Trolley Renewal Project; it reopened with a renovated station platform in November 2014.

Station layout
There are two tracks, each with a side platform.

See also
 List of San Diego Trolley stations

References

Blue Line (San Diego Trolley)
Railway stations in the United States opened in 1981
San Diego Trolley stations
Transportation in Chula Vista, California
Buildings and structures in Chula Vista, California
1981 establishments in California